Moulay Idriss Khanousi (born 1939) is a Moroccan football defender who played for the Morocco in the 1970 FIFA World Cup. He also played for MAS Fez. Also, Khanousi was a nurse.

References

1939 births
Moroccan footballers
Morocco international footballers
Association football defenders
Botola players
Maghreb de Fès players
1970 FIFA World Cup players
Competitors at the 1967 Mediterranean Games
Footballers at the 1964 Summer Olympics
Olympic footballers of Morocco
People from Fez, Morocco
Living people
Mediterranean Games competitors for Morocco